The Legend of Eileen Chang is a 2004 biographical drama TV series written by Wang Hui-ling and produced by Hsu Li-kong, starring Rene Liu as Eileen Chang, one of China's greatest authors in the 20th century.

Filmed in Shanghai, China, and British Columbia, Canada, the show first aired on Taiwan's Public Television Service on January 12, 2004. In mainland China, the series was not broadcast until 2007 as a result of censorship, which forced all characters to be renamed (the lead character became "Wang Xiaowen") and the show to be completely dubbed. Government censors likely were concerned not just with Chang's well-known anti-Communist beliefs, but also with "glorification" of Chang's first husband Hu Lancheng, who served Japanese interest during the Second Sino-Japanese War and is traditionally considered a hanjian in China.

Cast
Rene Liu as Eileen Chang
Winston Chao as Hu Lancheng
Zhou Xiaoli as Su Qing
Kou Zhenhai as Chang Chih-yi, Eileen Chang's father
Ru Ping as Huang Yifan, Eileen Chang's biological mother
Wang Lin as Sun Yongfan, Eileen Chang's stepmother
Yan Xiaopin as Chang Mao-yuan, Eileen Chang's aunt

References

External links 
 

2004 Taiwanese television series debuts
2004 Taiwanese television series endings
Eileen Chang